Aropuk Lake is a 15-mile-long (24 km) lake in the U.S. state of Alaska, located 15 miles (24 km) north of Baird Inlet.

External links

Bodies of water of Bethel Census Area, Alaska
Lakes of Alaska